Gasil (also Romanized as Gasīl and Kasīl) is a village in Nesa Rural District, Asara District, Karaj County, Alborz Province, Iran.

Population
At the 2006 census, its population was 188, in 59 families.

References 

Populated places in Karaj County